The year 1951 saw extensive exploration of space by the United States and the Soviet Union (USSR) using suborbital rockets. The Soviets launched their first series of biomedical tests to the  boundary of space (as defined by the World Air Sports Federation). Several American agencies launched more than a dozen scientific sounding rocket flights between them. The US Navy launched its Viking sounding rocket for the seventh time since 1949, this time to a record-breaking  in August 1951.

Development also continued by both superpowers on rockets more powerful than the World War Two era German V-2 that had inaugurated the age of spaceflight. The USSR advanced far beyond their R-1 (a V-2 copy) with the deployment of the R-2 rocket, which could carry a ton of explosives twice as far as its predecessor. Though the ambitious Intermediate Range Ballistic Missile was canceled in 1951, the more achievable R-5 missile project was initiated. Both the US Air Force and the US Army initiated their first post-V-2 ballistic missile projects, Atlas for the former and Redstone for the latter.

Space exploration

United States

The US Army, US Air Force, and the Applied Physics Laboratory continued their use of Aerobee on a variety of physics, aeronomy, photography, weather, and biomedical sounding rocket flights; a total of 11 were launched during the year. Two of these comprised the earliest space biomedical missions. Launched by the Air Force, and carrying mice and monkeys, they (along with a third flight in 1952) determined that brief (approx. 15 minutes) exposure to acceleration, reduced gravity, and high altitude cosmic radiation did not have significant negative effects.

The first generation of US Navy-built Viking sounding rockets reached its acme of performance with the flight of Viking 7, the sole Viking launch of 1951.

Soviet Union

The R-1, the Soviet Union's first domestically built long-range ballistic missile, was accepted into service in November 1950. In January 1951, cold-weather testing of the R-1 for quality assurance purposes was conducted. On 1 June, production of the R-1 was centralized and transferred to a former automobile factory in Dnepropetrovsk, and that month, a test series of R-1s was successfully launched to the edge of space, all landing within  of their targets. Though the R-1, a virtual copy of the now-obsolete V-2, was not a particularly formidable weapon and posed virtually no threat to the West, it was invaluable in training engineers and missile crews, as well as creating a nascent rocket industry in the Soviet Union.

On 29 January 1951, dogs were carried on one of the winter test flights of the R-1. This was followed in the summer by six R-1s specifically designed and equipped for biomedical flights to determine if their payload dogs could survive the rigors of space travel and be recovered. Three of the missions were successful.

The R-2 missile, the first operational Soviet design to have a separable nose cone, underwent a second test series of thirteen flights in July 1951, experiencing one failure.

Spacecraft development

US Air Force

By 1950, the war-head carrying ballistic missile, which in the United States had been eclipsed since World War II by guided missile development, received national priority. In January 1951, the US Air Force's Air Research and Development Command awarded to Consolidated Vultee the contract for Atlas, the nation's first Intercontinental ballistic missile. The Atlas went on to become one of the key boosters in America's crewed and robotic space programs, first orbiting a payload (SCORE) in 1958.

US Army

On 15 April 1950, Wernher von Braun and his team of German rocket engineers were transferred from Fort Bliss to Redstone Arsenal in Alabama. In 1951, the Redstone team was tasked with researching and developing guided missiles and developing and testing free rockets, solid propellants, Jet-Assisted Take-off rockets, and related items, thus making the Army a leading player in America's missile development. Their work led to the production of the Redstone missile, first launched in 1953, versions of which ultimately launched Explorer 1, America's first artificial satellite, in 1958, and Mercury-Redstone 3, America's first human space mission, in 1961.

US Navy

In the summer of 1950, the United States Naval Research Laboratory (NRL) team led by Milton Rosen began work on an improved Viking rocket able to reach higher altitudes. The team would achieve increased performance through larger fuel tanks and reduced weight elsewhere on the rocket. Originally planned for launch in 1951, the development of the second generation Viking took two years, and the first of the new rockets would not launch until 6 June 1952.

University of Iowa

In January 1951, Dr. James Van Allen, instrumental in the development of the Aerobee rocket, joined the physics department at the State University of Iowa (SUI). Along with University of Chicago graduate Melvin B. Gottlieb and Van Allen's first SUI graduate student, Leslie H. Meredith, they began a high altitude cosmic ray research program using equipment mounted on balloons. Launched from 16 June 1951, through 26 January 1952, this experience set the foundation for balloon-launched sounding rockets, which would first breach the boundary of space in 1954.

Soviet Union

From 1947, the German émigré-designed G-1 (or R-10) missile competed with the Soviet-designed R-2 for limited engineering and production staff, the latter winning out by the end of 1949. With the project stalled for a lack of resources and government interest, the Soviets terminated all work by the German specialists in October 1950. In December 1951, the first of the specialists were repatriated to East Germany (a process that the Soviets completed in November 1953).

The draft plan for the ambitious  range R-3 had been approved on 7 December 1949, but was canceled on 20 October 1951, other designs proving more useful and achievable. The R-5's conceptual design was completed by 30 October 1951.

Launches

January

|}

February

|}

March

|}

April

|}

May

|}

June

|}

July

|}

August

|}

September

|}

October

|}

November

|}

Suborbital launch summary

By country

By rocket

See also
Timeline of spaceflight

References

Footnotes

1951 in spaceflight
1951 in science
1950s in transport